
 

In Isolation: Dispatches from Occupied Donbas is a history and memoir of life under Russian occupation during the Russo-Ukrainian War in eastern Ukraine. It was written by Stanislav Aseyev, translated from Ukrainian by Lidia Wolanskyj and published by The Harvard Ukrainian Research Institute and Harvard University Press in 2022.

Reviews

Publication history
 3 May 2022: Original hardback and eBook edition.

See also
 Timeline of the war in Donbas
 Combatants of the war in Donbas

References

Notes

Citations

External links
 

War in Donbas non-fiction